Protheca is a genus of beetles in the family Ptinidae. There are at least three described species in Protheca.

Species
These three species belong to the genus Protheca:
 Protheca guadalupensis (Pic, 1909) g
 Protheca hispida LeConte, 1865 i c g b
 Protheca plicatipennis (Pic, 1912) g
Data sources: i = ITIS, c = Catalogue of Life, g = GBIF, b = Bugguide.net

References

Further reading

External links

 

Ptinidae